Herst may refer to:

People
 Alison Herst (born 1971), Canadian sprint kayaker
 Herman “Pat” Herst, Jr. (1909–1999), philatelist and writer of books on philately. 
 Jerry Herst (1909–1990), American songwriter, co-writer of "So Rare"
 Richard Herst († 1628), a well-to-do yeoman in England of the 17th century.

See also
 Hearst (disambiguation)